Cascade College was a private, four-year, liberal arts college associated with the Churches of Christ.  Located in Portland, Oregon, United States, it was a branch campus of Oklahoma Christian University.  Its mission was to emphasize spiritual growth and career preparation.  Because of Cascade's ongoing financial problems, Oklahoma Christian University closed Cascade at the end of the 2009 academic year.

History 
Cascade had been founded as Columbia Christian College in 1956.  For several years, Columbia had serious financial difficulties. Partially as a consequence, its regional accreditation was revoked.  The school's board sought help from other colleges affiliated with Churches of Christ.  Oklahoma Christian University agreed to fund the college as a branch campus.  The newly renamed Cascade College opened in Fall 1994 after its acceptance as a branch by Oklahoma Christian University, with 143 students attending the first semester.

As a branch campus of Oklahoma Christian, Cascade College was accredited by The Higher Learning Commission of the North Central Association of Colleges and Schools and was authorized by the State of Oregon to offer and confer academic degrees. In October 2008, plans were announced to close Cascade, because of financial difficulties, at the end of the 2009 academic year.

Academics 
The college operated on a semester calendar.  It offered degree programs in pre-nursing, religion, business, marketing, English, interdisciplinary studies, elementary education, biology, communications and psychology. Cascade College also offered international study programs through its parent institution that created opportunities for students to experience other cultures.

Student life 
Cascade College had a variety of activities, including service clubs (Delta Sigma Rho, Kingsmen Service Club ((AKA Kappa Sigma Chi)), Lambda Chi Omega, Phi Alpha Sigma, Phi Phi Phi, Alpha Kappa Sigma (a/k/a AXE established in 1997/98 school year)), SIFE, drama club (Grease Paint), psychology club (Psi Beta Sigma), diversity club (Naked Souls), instrumental groups, The Nature Society, Witness, campus ministry, academic clubs (Alpha Chi & Summit Society), theater (Visions/Second Story) and choir opportunities.

Athletics 
The Cascade athletic teams were called the Thunderbirds. The college was a member of the National Association of Intercollegiate Athletics (NAIA), primarily competing in the Cascade Collegiate Conference (CCC) from 1997–98 to 2008–09. The mascot was the Thunderbird.

Cascade competed in nine intercollegiate varsity sports: Men's sports included basketball, cross country, soccer and track & field; while women's sports included basketball, cross country, soccer, track & field and volleyball.

Campus
The 11-acre historic Cascade College campus was purchased from Oklahoma Christian University and Cascade Inc. by Columbia Christian Schools in 2012 after a "campaign to save the campus for Christian education" in Portland.  Warner Pacific College, another Portland area Christian liberal arts college, and former partner with Cascade College, houses several continuing education classrooms and a computer lab.

Mission statement 
The mission statement was as follows: "Cascade College is a higher learning community which transforms lives for Christian faith, leadership, and service."

Controversies
Many questioned the decision to close the college in light of several multimillion-dollar projects which Oklahoma Christian had undertaken in recent years, including the erection of a clock tower estimated to cost $30 million.

References

External links
 Information about the College on Oklahoma Christian University's website
 Official website 
 Official athletics website 

Universities and colleges affiliated with the Churches of Christ
Universities and colleges in Portland, Oregon
Defunct Christian universities and colleges
Defunct private universities and colleges in Oregon
Educational institutions disestablished in 2009
1956 establishments in Oregon
2009 disestablishments in Oregon